Ahmad Al-Saraj (born March 2, 1995) is a professional squash player who represented Jordan. He reached a career-high world ranking of World No. 93 in February 2014.

References

External links 
 
 
 

Jordanian male squash players
Living people
1995 births
Squash players at the 2014 Asian Games
Sportspeople from Amman
Asian Games competitors for Jordan
21st-century Jordanian people